Megachile macularis is a species of bee in the family Megachilidae. It was described by Karl Wilhelm von Dalla Torre in 1896.

References

Macularis
Insects described in 1896